The double-density compact disc (DDCD) is an optical disc technology developed by Sony using the same laser wavelength as a compact disc, namely 780 nm. The format is defined by the Purple Book standard document. Unlike the compact-disc technology it is based on, DDCD was designed exclusively for data, with no audio capabilities.

For a 12 cm disc, it doubles the original 650 MB to 1.3 GB capacity of a CD on recordable (DDCD-R) and rewritable (DDCD-RW) discs by narrowing the track pitch from 1.6 to 1.1 micrometers, and shortening the minimum pit length from 0.833 to 0.623 micrometers. The DDCD was also available in read-only format (DDCD-ROM). The specification allowed for both 12 cm and 8 cm discs, although it appears no 8 cm media was ever released.

The technology, released years after rewritable DVD technology, failed to acquire significant market share. The only DDCD recorder introduced was the Sony CRX200E. While the initial launch price of the drive and the disc ($249 and $2-3 respectively) was lower than the prices of DVD-RW drives and media ($1000 and $10 respectively), an 85% increase in storage compared to the standard 700 MB CDs was not enough to entice customers. A similar technology, however, was used in the GD-ROM discs primarily used for Sega Dreamcast software. DVD offered a significantly higher capacity - nearly four times more than DDCD-R with 4.7 GB on single layer discs and six and a half times more with 8.5 GB on double layer discs and would drop significantly in cost in the years after DDCD's launch.

The DDCD technology was marked as 'legacy' in the 2006-edition of the SCSI Multimedia Commands set (MMC).

Competition
DDCD was part of a wave of technologies aimed at enhancing the compact disc, none of which managed to gain much market share.

MultiLevel Recording (ML), developed in 1992 by Optex Corporation, was a proposed technology that never saw the light of the day. It promised to burn 2 GB onto one CD and a couple of disc burners from TDK and Plextor were set for release in 2002 for $200 with discs costing around $2. No ML products were ever released.

In September 2002, Sanyo announced it had achieved the same result as DDCD using standard CD-Rs with its HD-Burn technology. This allowed users to burn 1.4 GB on a standard 700 MB CD. However, the resulting CD could only be played back on DVD drives.

In 2003, Plextor released a CD burner that utilized their proprietary GigaRec technology to allow users to burn a maximum of 980 MB on a standard 80-minute CD and 1.2 GB of a 99-minute CD. Like DDCD, the result was achieved by burning smaller pits. The resulting disc could be read perfectly on Plextor GigaRec drives. Results with reading the disc on other optical drives were mixed.

See also
 Blu-ray Disc
 CD-R
 CD-RW
 GD-ROM
 DVD-ROM
 DVD-RW
 HD DVD
 MultiLevel Recording
 Rainbow Books

References

External links
 
 
 WORLD PC EXPO 2000 with photos of That's Double Density CD-R by Taiyo Yuden

120 mm discs
Audio storage
Video storage
Optical computer storage media